Arnold Boghaert (21 October 1920 – 29 November 1993) was a Belgian clergyman and bishop for the Roman Catholic Diocese of Roseau. Boghaert was born in Landegem. He became ordained in 1944. He was appointed bishop in 1956. He died on 29 November 1993, at the age of 73.

References

1920 births
1993 deaths
People from Nevele
20th-century Roman Catholic bishops in Belgium
Belgian expatriates in Dominica
Roman Catholic bishops of Roseau